The Australian Art Orchestra (AAO) is one of Australia's leading contemporary ensembles. Founded by pianist Paul Grabowsky in 1994, it has been led by composer/trumpeter/sound artist Peter Knight since 2013 and led by pianist/composer/producer Aaron Choulai since 2023. The Orchestra explores relationships between musical disciplines and cultures, imagining new musical concepts that reference how 21st century Australia responds to its cultural and musical history.

The AAO regularly tours both in Australia and internationally.

History

With Paul Grabowsky
The intention of the Australian Art Orchestra's work has always been to playfully explore the balance between avant-garde and traditional Jazz forms, allowing the incorporation of diverse influences to reference the importance this plays in the history of jazz.

The AAO began as a contemporary jazz orchestra but early on developed distinctive cross-cultural collaborations. These included  Into the Fire and The Chennai Tapes. In 1996 the Australian Art Orchestra first collaborated with one of South India's most significant musicians, mridangam virtuoso Kaaraikkudi R Mani in India. In 1999 this collaboration created Into the Fire, a piece bridging Australian and Indian traditions arranged for the orchestra by Adrian Sherriff. This piece was released on CD in 2000 on ABC classics. The association with Kaaraikkudi R Mani became a long-term project that toured all over the world, becoming an Australian world music collaboration. This partnership also produced the album, The Chennai Tapes and touring group,Two Oceans. Arguably, the collaboration between Mani and AAO developed a completely original style of music, a meeting between the Carnatic tradition and Western jazz.

In 1997 the AAO drew inspiration from J.S. Bach's St Matthew Passion. Originally, five Australian Art Orchestra composers, Doug de Vries, Paul Grabowsky, John Rodgers, Niko Schauble and Alister Spence, were tasked to interpret five movements from the Bach original. Their compositions reimagined Bach's work rather than adapted it. Passion continues to progress and evolve for the AAO. Orchestra collaborators Ruby Hunter and Archie Roach were commissioned by the 2005 Festival de Mexico Centro Historico to compose and perform three love songs to add to the Passion composition. Another movement was commissioned in 2014 by Soundstreams in Toronto who asked Nicole Lizée to expand the piece with her own interpretation for Passion'''s Canadian premiere with a work called Hymns to Pareidolia.

The piece Testimony composed by Sandy Evans in 1995, was successfully transformed into a stage show by The Australian Art Orchestra in 2002. The composition is about the life of Charlie ‘Bird’ Parker and follows an epic poem by Pulitzer Prize winner Yusef Komunyakaa. The Australian Art Orchestra record label was founded in 2008.

In 2004 Grabowsky began a collaboration with Ruby Hunter and Archie Roach, two musicians whose life stories inspired Ruby's Story. Ruby was taken away from he family as a child, only learning of her aboriginal heritage when reading a picture-book at school about Captain Cook. She spent time living on the streets and met fellow musician Archie at a Salvation Army centre in Adelaide. The compositions explore these themes and the redemption they found in each other when they met, concluding with them travelling back to Ruby's country beside the Murray to raise a family. Tracks from the CD Ruby still often play on Australian radio and the album receives good reviews. Ruby was the first release on the Australian Art Orchestra record label.

Other cross-cultural collaborations include The Theft of Sita with musicians from Indonesia premiering the piece at Melbourne Festival on 1 November 2000. Theft of Sita is a retelling of the epic Sanskrit legend The Ramayana and draws on Balinese shadow puppetry. This project toured all over the world and vastly increased the AAO's following.Crossing Roper Bar was created with musicians from Arnhem Land from 2005. This linking of jazz traditions with such a venerable ancient culture was considered revolutionary. A recording was made in Alan Eaton Studio, St Kilda in 2009, during a Melbourne residency, following many live performances of the piece. There was an official tour featuring Benjamin Wilfred and the Young Wagilak Group in 2010, when the CD was released on the AAO label. The goal of the project was to inspire a wider audience to look into the traditions of their ancestors, the original people of Australia in the hope of inspiring respectful engagement.

With Peter Knight

Since Grabowsky's departure the Australian Art Orchestra has developed an even more contemporary style under Peter Knight's direction. Knight has instigated collaborations with international composers, including iconic American composer Alvin Lucier, Canadian composer Nicole Lizée and Japanese composer Keiichiro Shibuya. The development of the Orchestra's collaborations with Australian indigenous musicians, and musicians from Asia has continued under Knight's direction receiving critical acclaim.

The Australian Art Orchestra has also drawn significant praise for its ground breaking Creative Music Intensive program which brings musicians from around the world together in Tarraleah, in the Tasmanian Central Highlands, to share ideas about collaborating musically across cultures. This program was initiated by Peter Knight in 2014 and its first iteration was in Cairns.

In 2022, Australian Art Orchestra was acknowledged with a National Luminary AMC/APRA Art Music Award.

In 2016 the Creative Music Intensive was nominated for the AMC Art Music Award for Excellence in Music Education. In the same year the AAO premiered Peter Knight's, Diomira, which was also nominated for an AMC Art Music Award for Instrumental Work of the Year. The piece went on to win the 2016 Albert H. Maggs Composition Award. In 2017 Diomira was extended to a full length concert work with video by artist, Scott Morrison, and premiered as part of the Melbourne Festival.Water Pushes Sand merged Jazz and Sichuan folk music styles and featured Zheng Sheng Li, a Sichuan ‘face changing’ dancer along with four other musicians from Cheng Du in Sichuan, and five AAO musicians. Composer Erik Griswold and percussionist Vanessa Tomlinson (together known as Clocked Out) spent 15 years researching Sichuan's music and culture before this work was created.

The world premiere of Water Pushes Sand was at OzAsia Festival in 2015. A full house show at Arts Centre Melbourne as a part of Melbourne Festival 2015 followed.

The CD, released in 2016 was nominated for ‘2016 Jazz Work of the Year’ at the APRA/AMC Art Music Awards and an ARIA Award for Jazz Work of the Year, receiving positive reviews in the media. In 2017 Water Pushes Sand toured Australia including Darwin Festival.

Notable performances
1997
 Methodist Ladies College Music Auditorium, Melbourne

1998
 Adelaide Festival of the Arts, Adelaide

1999
 Melbourne Town Hall, Melbourne, Performance of Passion2001
 Sydney Festival, Sydney Opera House, Performance of Passion2005
 Festival de Mexico Centro Historico, Mexico, Performance of Passion2007
 Castlemaine State Festival, Performance of Passion2008
 Artshouse, North Melbourne Town Hall, Performance of Passion2009
 In March the AAO performed Ringing the Bell Backwards at Elisabeth Murdoch Hall, Melbourne Recital Centre to correspond with the release of a remastered recording of this piece
 In April the AAO performed Passion at Elisabeth Murdoch Hall, Melbourne Recital Centre, Melbourne
 In August the AAO performed Ruby’s Story at the Civic Centre, Wagga Wagga, NSW
 Also in August the AAO and the Young Wagilak Group performed Crossing Roper Bar at Elisabeth Murdoch Hall, Melbourne Recital Centre
 On September 22 the AAO and the Young Wagilak Group performed Crossing Roper Bar at the APRA Classical Music Awards as winners of the 2009 Outstanding Contribution to Australian Music in a Regional Area Award at the Playhouse Theatre, Sydney
 In October the AAO and The Sruthi Laya Ensemble featuring Karaaikkudi Mani performed Into The Fire on a tour of Australia, which played at two major concerts, in Melbourne at the Recital Centre followed by special VIP functions at both the Melbourne Recital Centre and the National Gallery of Victoria; and in Brisbane, Griffith University Recital Hall. This was followed by a five-day residency at Griffith University in Queensland, marking the release of The Chennai Sessions CD
 Also in October the AAO and special guests Marc Hannaford and Ken Eadie performed Scott Tinkler's Folk at Wangaratta Jazz Festival, Wangaratta Performing Arts Centre

2014
 Toronto Soundstreams. Performance of Passion, and world premiere performance of new work by Nicole Lizée (Montreal) commissioned by Soundstreams
 Hong Kong Academy of Performing Arts performances of Crossing Roper Bar
 Melbourne Recital Centre. World premiere of new work by Brett Thompson, Atlas, Herbal and Ritual commissioned by AAO 
 Malthouse Theatre 20Up 20th Anniversary Concert featuring works from AAO 20-year history plus world premiere of new work by Austin Buckett, Virtuoso Pause, commissioned by AAO. Live broadcast ABC Classic FM

2015
 MONA FOMA (Tasmania) Performances of Crossing Roper Bar
 Jazzahead Bremen (Germany). Market showcase of Crossing Roper Bar
 Chengdu China. Creative development and concerts for Water Pushes Sand
 OzAsia Festival. Water Pushes Sand world premiere
 Melbourne Festival performances and album recording Water Pushes Sand
 Wangaratta Jazz Festival with Dave Douglas and Monash Art Ensemble

2016
 Sydney Festival, Exit Ceremonies new works for pipe organ and mixed ensemble with Ensemble Offspring featuring new work by Austin Buckett commissioned by AAO
 Melbourne Town Hall Exit Ceremonies featuring new work by Alvin Lucier commissioned by AAO
 Metropolis New Music Festival opening concert featuring Nicole Lizée including new works from Lizée and Peter Knight commissioned by AAO

2017
 Water Pushes Sand Darwin Festival
 Diomira by Peter Knight, Melbourne Festival
 OzAsia Meeting Points, including works by Keiichiro Shibuya (Japan), Mindy Meng Wang (China/Australia), Daniel Wilfred (Arnhem Land) and Bael Il Dong (Korea).

 Sydney Festival, Sex, Lynch, and Video Games. The screen works of Nicole Lizée (Canada), featuring Nicole Lizée

Discography
Albums

Awards and nominations
Australian Music Centre

! 
|-
| 2013
| Australian Art Orchestra
| AMC/APRA Art Music Award Performance of the Year
| 
| 
|-
| 2014
| Australian Art Orchestra
| AMC/APRA Art Music Award for Excellence by an Organisation
| 
| 
|-
| 2016
| Australian Art Orchestra
| Art Music Award nomination for Excellence in Music Education
| 
| 
|-
| 2016
| Australian Art Orchestra
| Excellence in Music Education
| 
| 
|-
| 2017
| Australian Art Orchestra
| Instrumental Work of the Year
| 
| 
|-

ARIA Music Awards
The ARIA Music Awards is an annual awards ceremony that recognises excellence, innovation, and achievement across all genres of Australian music. They commenced in 1987. 

! 
|-
| 1995
| Ringing the Ball Backwards|rowspan="4"| Best Jazz Album
| 
|rowspan="4"| 
|-
| 2000
| Into the Fire (with Sruthi Laya Ensemble)
| 
|-
| 2017
| Water Pushes Sand| 
|-
| 2021
| Closed Beginnings (with Reuben Lewis, Tariro Mavondo & Peter Knight)
| 
|-
| 2022
| Hand to Earth'' (with Daniel Wilfred, Sunny Kim, Peter Knight & Aviva Endean)
| ARIA Award for Best World Music Album
| 
|

Australian Jazz Bell Award

! 
|-
| 2003
| Australian Art Orchestra
| Jazz Ensemble of the Year
| 
| 
|-
| 2011
| Australian Art Orchestra
| Jazz Ensemble of the Year
| 
| 
|-

Classical Music Awards

! 
|-
| 2009
| Australian Art Orchestra
| Outstanding Contribution to Australian Music in a Regional Area
| 
| 
|-

Helpmann Awards

! 
|-
| 2005
| Australian Art Orchestra
| Helpmann Award
| 
| 
|-

Sidney Myer Performing Arts Awards

! 
|-
| 2010
| Australian Art Orchestra
| Group Award
| 
| 
|-

See also

List of experimental big bands

References

External links
 Australian Art Orchestra official web site

Australian world music groups
Australian jazz ensembles
Experimental big bands
Musical groups established in 1994
Organisations based in Melbourne
1994 establishments in Australia